Professor John Owusu Gyapong is a Ghanaian Professor of Epidemiology. He is currently the Vice Chancellor of the University of Health and Allied Sciences, Ho Ghana.

Education 
Gyapong obtained an MB ChB degree from Kwame Nkrumah University of Science and Technology in 1987.  He undertook his postgraduate studies at the London School of Hygiene and Tropical Medicine, University of London, England where he earned an MSc in public health in developing countries in 1993, and later a Ph.D in Epidemiology in 1997.

Career 
Before assuming the office of Vice Chancellor of the University of Health and Allied Sciences, Gyapong was serving his second term as the Pro-Vice-Chancellor for Research, Innovation and Development at the University of Ghana. He also worked in various capacities at the Ghana Health Service and was chairman of the Food and Drugs Authority Clinical Trials Technical Committee. Outside the University, Gyapong has had a wide and varied international experience and exposure.

Gyapong has provided expertise as a technical advisor to several national and international organisations and institutions, some of which he has chaired.  These include: The World Bank; World Health Organisation and the European and Developing Countries Clinical Trials Partnership (EDCTP).These several roles over the last two decades culminated in his appointment as a Commissioner to the Lancet-University of Oslo Commission on the Global Governance for Health, an independent academic research initiative managed in collaboration with the Harvard Global Health Institute.

Research interests 
Gyapong's main area of research is infectious disease epidemiology, especially lymphatic filariasis, malaria, and other neglected tropical diseases. He has been involved in several large scale epidemiological field trials in Ghana including the Ghana on Vitamin A Supplementation, Malaria intervention studies, and Social and economic impact of lymphatic filariasis. For over 10 years he was Director for Research and Development of the Ghana Health Service where he was responsible for health systems research. He has received at least 5 million dollars of research grants as of 2016.

Before assuming responsibility as Pro-Vice Chancellor he was the Vice-Dean and Professor in Epidemiology and Disease Control at the School of Public Health of the University of Ghana, and an Adjunct Professor of International Health at Georgetown University in Washington, D.C. He serves on several international research review committees and boards.

Affiliations 
 Fellow, Royal Society of Tropical Medicine and Hygiene
 Fellow, American Society of Tropical Medicine and Hygiene
 Fellow, Ghana College of Physicians and Surgeons
 Fellow, Ghana Academy of Arts and Sciences

References 

Living people
Year of birth missing (living people)
Ghanaian public health doctors
Kwame Nkrumah University of Science and Technology alumni
Vice-Chancellors of universities in Ghana
People educated at St. Thomas Aquinas Senior High School
Presbyterian Boys' Senior High School alumni
Fellows of the Ghana Academy of Arts and Sciences